Lũng Cú Flag Tower (Vietnamese: Cột cờ Lũng Cú) is a monument in northern Vietnam. It is located in Lũng Cú commune of Dong Van district in Ha Giang province. The tower is topped with a large Vietnamese flag. The monument was built to mark the northernmost point in Vietnam, although the farthest north point on the Chinese-Vietnamese border is actually located over  farther north.

References

External links 
 VietnamTourism description of the flag tower

Towers in Vietnam